The following is a list of the municipalities (comuni) of Abruzzo, Italy.

There are 305 municipalities in Abruzzo (as of January 2019):

104 in the Province of Chieti
108 in the Province of L'Aquila
46 in the Province of Pescara
47 in the Province of Teramo

List

References

 
Geography of Abruzzo
Abruzzo